Zimbabwe competed at the 2019 African Games held from 19 to 31 August 2019 in Rabat, Morocco. Zimbabwe competed in 12 sports. In total, athletes representing the country won one silver medal and three bronze medals and the country finished in 31st place in the medal table, shared with Republic of the Congo.

Medal summary

Medal table 

|  style="text-align:left; width:78%; vertical-align:top;"|

|  style="text-align:left; width:22%; vertical-align:top;"|

Archery 

Rebecca Minnaar and Humayoon Poonja competed in archery.

Poonja competed in the men's individual recurve event and Minnaar competed in the women's individual recurve event. Both competed in the mixed team recurve event as well.

Athletics 

Dickson Kamungeremu and Ngoni Makusha competed in the men's 100 metres event. Both were eliminated in the semifinals.

Ngoni Makusha, Tatenda Tsumba and Kundai Maguranyanga competed in the men's 200 metres event. Makusha and Tsumba were both eliminated in the semifinals.

Faith Dube competed in the women's 200 metres event. She did not advance to the semifinals.

Chess 

Rodwell Makoto, Emarald Takudzwa Mushore, Linda Dalitso Shaba and Colletah Wakuruwarewa competed in chess. They won the bronze medal in the rapid mixed team event.

Equestrian 

Zimbabwe competed in both the individual jumping event and the team jumping event.

Judo 

Seven athletes represented Zimbabwe in judo: Lazarus Arufandika, Janine Vimbai Kayaya, Benjamin Mashayi, Majaji Tapiwa Seth Keith Musariri, Moses Mutende, Sydney Alex Mutero and Christi-Rose Maria Pretorius.

Swimming 

Five swimmers represented Zimbabwe in swimming.

Robyn Lee won the bronze medal in the women's 200 metre backstroke event.

Men

Women

Mixed

 Legend: (*) = Swimmers who participated in the heat only.

Taekwondo 

Three athletes represented Zimbabwe: Spencer Kondo (men's –68 kg), Lazarus Kuzivakwashe Maringehosi (men's –80 kg) and Kudzai Chimombe (men's –87 kg) competed in Taekwondo.

Tennis 

Valeria Shamiso Bhunu, Beverly Nyasha Matsiwe, Takanyi Garanganga, Benjamin Lentaigne Lock, Courtney John Ingram Lock and Mehluli Don Ayanda Sibanda competed in tennis.

Garanganga, Sibanda, Lock and Lock competed in the men's singles event.

Garanganga and Sibanda as well as Lock and Lock competed in the men's doubles event.

Garanganga, Sibanda, Lock and Lock also competed in the men's team event.

Bhunu and Matsiwe competed in the women's singles event.

Triathlon 

Matthew Denslow, Jordyn Jacobs, Andie Kuipers and Laurelle Brown competed in triathlon events.

Kuipers won the bronze medal in the women's event with a time of 1:08:57. Brown won the silver medal in the women's event with a time of 1:07:52.

In the men's event Denslow finished 11th with a time of 1:08:08 and Jacobs finished 14th with a time of 1:09:03.

Volleyball 

Nyengeterai Danai Guyo and Progress O Gasa represented Zimbabwe in beach volleyball in the women's tournament. They finished in 13th place.

References 

Nations at the 2019 African Games
2019
African Games